Guillemette Laurens (born 6 November 1957 in Fontainebleau, France) is a French operatic mezzo-soprano.

Guillemette trained at the Academy of Toulouse and debuted as Baba in The Rake's Progress at Salle Favart. She took part in the premiere recording of Lully's Atys conducted by William Christie. She is a highly respected singer of Baroque music, both as a soprano and a mezzo-soprano. She has made notable recordings of Monteverdi operas.

Selecting Recordings

 Jean-Féry Rebel: Ulysse. Les Solistes du Marais: Guillemette Laurens, Stéphanie Révidat, Bertrand Chuberre, Bernard Deletré, Céline Ricci, Eugénie Warnier, Vincent Lièvre-Picard, Thomas van Essen, Le Chœur du Marais, La Simphonie du Marais, conducted by Hugo Reyne. Recorded 9–10 July 2007. [Saint-Sulpice-le-Verdon, Vendée]: Conseil Général de la Vendée, Ⓟ 2007. Musiques à la Chabotterie 605003
Camille Saint-Saëns, Oratorio de Noël, Marie Paule Dotti, soprano, Guillemette Laurens, mezzo-soprano, Luca Lombardo, ténor, Nicolas Testé, basse, Francesco Cera, orgue, Coro della Radio Swizzera, Lugano, Orchestra della Swizzera Italiana, dir. Diego Fasolis. CD Chandos 2004

External links

People from Fontainebleau
1957 births
Living people
French operatic mezzo-sopranos
French women singers